Her Majesty's Principal Secretary of State for Energy and Climate Change was a British Government cabinet position from 2008 to 2016. The Department of Energy and Climate Change was created on 3 October 2008 when then-Prime Minister Gordon Brown reshuffled his Cabinet.

Between 1974 and 1992, the post was known as Secretary of State for Energy.

The Energy and Climate Change Secretary revived the earlier post of the Secretary of State for Energy as head of the Department of Energy, existing from 1974 to 1992. After which, the Department of Energy was merged into the Department of Trade and Industry under the Conservative government of Sir John Major in 1992.

Sixteen years later, immediately prior to the creation of the new department, energy policy was the responsibility of the Department for Business, Enterprise and Regulatory Reform (itself now a defunct government department, superseded by the Department for Business, Innovation and Skills).

Former Labour Leader Ed Miliband was the inaugural Secretary of State at DECC. After Labour lost the 2010 general election and the Cameron-Clegg coalition was formed, Chris Huhne was appointed as his successor. On 3 February 2012, Huhne resigned from the post after it was announced that he would be prosecuted for perverting the course of justice, in relation to accusations that he passed on speeding penalties to his ex-wife to avoid losing his own licence. The post was taken over by Ed Davey on the same day, and served until the Liberal Democrats left government, and Davey lost his seat, in 2015.

Amber Rudd was the final Secretary of State at DECC, until she became Home Secretary. The post was formed into the new Department for Business, Energy and Industrial Strategy by new Prime Minister Theresa May in July 2016.

The role is now part of the portfolio belonging to the Minister of State for Business, Energy and Clean Growth, Graham Stuart.

List of Secretaries of State
Colour key

See also
 Minister of State at the Department of Energy and Climate Change
 Shadow Secretary of State for Energy and Climate Change
 Secretary of State for Energy Security and Net Zero

References

Department of Energy and Climate Change
Energy and Climate Change
Ministerial offices in the United Kingdom
Energy ministers